Bullichthys is an extinct genus of albuliform fish which existed in the Romualdo Formation, Brazil during the Early Cretaceous (Albian) period. The type species is B. santanensis.

References 

Albuliformes
Prehistoric ray-finned fish genera
Cretaceous bony fish
Early Cretaceous fish
Albian life
Prehistoric fish of South America
Early Cretaceous animals of South America
Cretaceous Brazil
Fossils of Brazil
Romualdo Formation
Fossil taxa described in 2010